Syndle (historic: "Søndlevatn") is a lake in the municipality of Grimstad in Agder county, Norway. The  lake Syndle flows into a small river on the northeast part of the lake which connects it to the neighboring lake Rore which eventually flows into the river Nidelva.

See also 
 List of lakes in Aust-Agder
 List of lakes in Norway

References 

Grimstad
Lakes of Agder